Damirchi Darrehsi may refer to:
 Damirchi Darrehsi-ye Olya
 Damirchi Darrehsi-ye Sofla